Burra is a pastoral centre and historic tourist town in the mid-north of South Australia. It lies east of the Clare Valley in the Bald Hills range, part of the northern Mount Lofty Ranges, and on Burra Creek. The town began as a single company mining township that, by 1851, was a set of townships (company, private and government-owned) collectively known as "The Burra". The Burra mines supplied 89% of South Australia's and 5% of the world's copper for 15 years, and the settlement has been credited (along with the mines at Kapunda) with saving the economy of the struggling new colony of South Australia. The Burra Burra Copper Mine was established in 1848 mining the copper deposit discovered in 1845. Miners and townspeople migrated to Burra primarily from Cornwall, Wales, Scotland and Germany. The mine first closed in 1877, briefly opened again early in the 20th century and for a last time from 1970 to 1981.

When the mine was exhausted and closed the population shrank dramatically and the townships, for the next 100 years, supported pastoral and agricultural activities. Today the town continues as a centre for its surrounding farming communities and, being one of the best-preserved towns of the Victorian era in Australia, as a historic tourist centre.

The Burra Charter, which outlines the best practice standard for cultural heritage management in Australia, is named for a conference held here in 1979 by Australia ICOMOS (International Council on Monuments and Sites) where the document was adopted.

Geology and geography

Burra is located within the Hundred of Kooringa a few kilometres inside Goyder's Line, near Burra, Baldina and Gum creeks. The lies within the Temperate Grassland of South Australia.

The main body of copper ore formed between two geological faults in broken dolomite rocks. The ore body was up to 70 metres (230 ft) wide and mainly consisted of green malachite and blue azurite veins and nodules amongst the host rock. The malachite and azurite were formed from copper sulphide minerals, by a process known as "secondary enrichment". This process took millions of years to convert the low grade copper sulphide ore, which was probably created 300 to 400 millions of years ago during the last period of vulcanism near Burra.

Etymology

The name applied to what is now the town of Burra has changed over time. The Burra Burra Copper Mine was named after the Burra Burra Creek that flows through the town. From at least 1851 the collection of townships near the mine became referred to as "The Burra". The town of Burra was officially formed in 1940 by a notice in the South Australian Government Gazette with the consolidation of the mostly culturally-based townships of Redruth, Aberdeen, New Aberdeen, Hampton, Copperhouse, Kooringa, Llwchwr, and Lostwithiel.

The name Burra Burra has been asserted to have come from numerous sources. As early as July 1843, when the locality was already a sheep outstation for pastoralist William Peter of Manoora, it was known as Burrow Creek. Despite that obvious (though misspelt) connection to the indigenous Ngadjuri people, a later theory persistently postulates that it comes from the Hindustani for 'great great', used by Indians shepherds working for another early pastoralist, James Stein, to refer to creek. The name could also have come from Stein's home country of Scotland or a number of Aboriginal languages. A so-called 'English Burra Burra' was discovered in 1851 in Devon in the Cornwall and West Devon Mining Landscape; possibly coincidentally several ancient placenames such as Burrator in Devon and Burraton in Cornwall occur nearby; also possible origins for the name. A Burra Burra mine is located in Tennessee and named after the Australian one.

Early history

Original inhabitants
The original inhabitants of the Burra area were the Ngadjuri Aboriginal people whose first Western contact was in 1839. The first European squatter in this region was William Peter, whose head station was Gum Creek near Manoora. Pastoralists grazed much of the Ngadjuri land from the 1840s and, although there was conflict, Ngadjuri people worked as shepherds and wool scourers, particularly once the area was emptied during the gold rushes of the 1850s. Their population was seriously depleted by introduced European diseases and they were reported to be extinct by 1878. Traces remain with rock art and burial sites in the area and some people able to claim Ngadjuri ancestry.

Discovery of copper

On 9 June 1845 William Streair bore samples of a rich copper ore into the office of Henry Ayers, secretary of the South Australian Mining Association (SAMA). Streair, a young shepherd in the employ of local pastoralist James Stein, had walked the 90 miles from Burra as did Thomas Pickett, a shepherd on a neighbouring property who made a further find. News of the copper this heralded was published on 21 June in Adelaide newspapers, and the site was soon named The Monster Mine.

Governor George Grey had amended land grant regulations forcing the hundred of Kooringa to be a  rectangle, placing the two copper finds at opposite ends. Due to the £20,000 (sterling) price of the land it was divided in two, with each half sold to a different group and the division decided by lot. The surveyed area was named the Burra Creek Special Survey. A group of wealthy capitalists (known as "the nobs") purchased the southern half of the division and a group of shopkeepers, merchants and SAMA (collectively known as "the snobs") the northern half.

The Burra Burra Mine was established by the snobs in their northern selection, the Princess Royal Mine by the nobs in their southern. In 1846,  just north of the division was sold to the Scottish Australian Investment Company for £5,550 where they established the Bon Accord Mine. Mining began on 29 September 1845 with the first gunpowder charge set off on the monster Burra Burra copper lode and by mid-1846, the Bon Accord Mining Company had also commenced operations.

Mining

Burra Burra or 'Monster Mine' 

Until 1860 the mine was the largest metals mine in Australia. From 1845 to 1877 the mine produced approximately 50,000 tonnes of copper. The mine was reopened as a modern open cut in 1971, operating for a decade with 24,000 tonnes of copper extracted. The mine's Adelaide operation was run by Henry Ayers, secretary of SAMA, from its opening until the 1890s. Henry Roach was chief Captain, responsible for day-to-day operations, from 1847 to 1867.
The investors had put up a total of £12,320 of which £10,000 was spent purchasing the land. The first dividend was paid on 24 June 1847 and by 1 December 1847 the mine had returned total dividends of £49,280. Over the mine's 32-year life, less than 100 shareholders received £826,586 in mining dividends. All mining dividends stopped after the mine closed in 1877, with the mine area sold in 1902 and the last property of SAMA in Kooringa sold in 1914. A final dividend was paid on 5 May 1916 and SAMA was wound up and closed.

Most of the copper was for sale to India as it was taking over a third of world copper supply in the mid-19th century. Due to the lack of smelting in South Australia, copper ore was initially shipped to Cornwall. The company purchased a Cornish beam engine which was the first in Australia when erected in 1848. Due to the uneconomic state of the mine, in 1868 a decision made to open cut the mine. Mining ceased underground, having reached a depth of 183 metres (600 ft) and open-cut operations starting in 1870 although, over the remaining life of the mine, small underground operations extracted more ore than the expensive open cut.

Over the life of the mine, Henry Ayers jealously preserved shareholder profits by ruthlessly controlling wages and expenses. In October 1846 this caused the first strike, of masons and bricklayers, with the company refusing to pay more than 8 shillings per day. With declining copper prices (from £91 per ton in 1845 to £87 in 1848) the company continually sought to reduce wages. In August 1847 the company enticed Thomas Burr to take over as general manager, he having resigned his post as Deputy Surveyor General of South Australia, but by September 1848 the unsatisfied company directors had sacked him.  By 1848 the wages reached their lowest level, which precipitated the Burra miners' strike, being the first industrial strike in South Australia and earliest workers' strike of any consequence in Australia. The strike came and went numerous times, with miners not completely returning to work until January 1849.

By April 1848 the mine was employing 567 people and supporting a population of 1,500 in the township of Kooringa. Employment at the mine peaked at 1,208 in 1859 and declined continuously until the mine's closure in 1877. In November 1877 most of the remaining disposable equipment and stores were sold off and mining by SAMA ceased.

Bon Accord Mine 
The Bon Accord Mining Company was formed on behalf of Scottish speculators, in the expectation that the Burra lode would extend under the properties boundary. No extension was found and, to recoup money, the townships of Aberdeen (1849) and New Aberdeen (1872) were formed on company land. Stoppage of pumping at the Burra Burra Mine in 1877 caused a rise in the water level in the neighbouring Bon Accord Mine forcing it to also close. Mining activity lasted from 1846 until 1849, was restarted in 1858 and finally ceased four years later with no orebody having been discovered. Many of the mine's buildings remain and are preserved by the National Trust of South Australia as a museum.

Princess Royal Mine 
The Princess Royal Mine was never successful, and in June 1859 the Princess Royal Mining Company closed its doors. The mine and surrounding  of then pastoral land was auctioned on 24 April 1860.

Pastoral activity

From as early as 1843 shepherding had been common around Burra, with pastoral pioneers such as James Stein and William Peter being granted grazing rights for their flocks on unsurveyed land. Over the life of the Burra Mine, most food was brought in as there was no freehold offered by SAMA on the land and no adjoining hundreds were declared until 1860. Agriculture was delayed by the slow surveying of hundreds, as until these had been done there was no freehold or leasehold land but only grazing rights. As Burra lies almost on Goyder's 1865 line it is rated at the edge of marginal land for farming. After mining the town became a pastoral centre, and South Australia's main sheep trading centre until the mid-20th century. The Baldina Run, a major sheep station of 50 square miles some 10 miles east of Burra, near Kooringa, was established by Henry Ayers in 1851, leased by J and C. B. Fisher until 1862, then taken over by Alfred Barker, son-in-law of James Chambers.

Media
The Burra Record was a newspaper covering Burra and the mid-north eastern area. The Burra Record had begun life as the Northern Mail, the town's first publication, which was first published on 30 June 1876. After 26 weekly issues, in 1877, it was renamed to Burra News and Northern Mail, before being renamed again in July 1878. In 1977, it merged with the Review-Times to form the Review-Times-Record, which in turn became The Flinders News in 1989.

Another publication was the County Light Times, produced in the town from 3 March 1949 to 22 February 1951. Published by Harold Du Rieue, the newspaper's coverage included the districts of Riverton, Tarlee, Rhynie and Saddleworth.

Burra was also home to the Mid North Broadcaster, a publication released from 2006 to 2013. It was formed by the merger of struggling local newspapers, the Peterborough Times (2003–2006), the Burra Broadcaster (1991–2006), and the Eudunda Observer. It was owned by the Taylor group, with editorial control via the Murray Pioneer. Its distribution included the towns of Burra, Eudunda, Jamestown and Peterborough.

Development of the town

During a visit in October 1845 to Burra by Henry Ayers and the directors of SAMA the site of the township of Kooringa was chosen. George Strickland Kingston surveyed and laid out the township, completing it in April 1846, and named many of the streets after directors of SAMA. From the beginning the township was a company town, built at low cost and with insufficient housing, which forced many miners to dig makeshift homes. In the census of 1851 over a third of the population were living along the creek and the census compiler took time to note:
There are no houses, the dwellings being excavated in the banks of the Burra Creek.

Largely due to the company nature of the settlement, development was slow, with the first bank not opening until 1859. Until the National Bank established the first branch in Kooringa, most exchange was either in the form of company scrip or at shops operating as money exchanges. All towns, except Kooringa, were built outside the mining lease but were still close to the mine as it was at the northern edge of the lease. The formation of the townships was forced by the refusal of SAMA to grant any freeholds within Kooringa, so miners began moving into other townships from the end of 1849. During their early lives, each of the townships largely had their own hotels, churches, post offices, schools, and shops and identity. In 1851 the gold rush near Bathurst, New South Wales, emptied the town of many miners. Whole families, government officials and other townspeople left for the gold fields and by 1854 the town appeared largely deserted. The number of townships increased dramatically as a result of an 1858 proposal to extend a railway line from Gawler. When the railway failed to be built most of the new townships failed and, in 1876, the remaining townships formed the Corporation of Burra.

In September 1846 the townships had their first police force with the movement of four constables from Julia Creek to the south into temporary accommodation provided by SAMA. Permanent lockup cells and stables were completed in Redruth mid-1847. In September that year, William Lang was appointed resident magistrate and coroner for the Murray District and initially housed in a company cottage in Kooringa. The first hotel was a temporary wooden structure erected at the entrance to the township of Kooringa in mid-1846, and the first permanent hotel was the Burra Hotel (opened 25 September 1847) built by William Paxton, a SAMA director and original owner of Ayers House. The Burra Hotel became the town's first public hospital in 1878 and was demolished in 1968.

Burra's first parliamentary representative was George Strickland "Paddy" Kingston who was elected in 1851 to the first legislative council as member for Burra and Clare, and for the same area to the house of assembly in its first parliament of 1857.

Piped water was supplied from 1884 from the flooded and abandoned Bon Accord Mine with water reaching 100 houses by 1885. This was the primary source for Burra until 1966 when it was replaced with water piped from the Murray River. The Burra received its first supply of electricity on 27 March 1924 from the newly formed Burra electric supply company.

The historic Burra neighbourhoods of Kooringa, Llwchwr, Aberdeen, New Aberdeen, and Graham ceased to be separately recognised and were included as part of Burra township proper in July 1940. Redruth was renamed "Burra North" at that time; it would eventually be merged with Burra as well.

Burra's population has declined from a peak of 5,000 in 1851 to a present figure of approximately 1,000. The dramatic decrease at the end of mining inhibited expansion and helped preserve many of the original buildings and houses. The District Council of Burra was proclaimed in 1872, the Town Corporation in 1876 and in 1969 the District Council and Town Corporation were amalgamated.

Townships

Redruth

Redruth was a government township formed in 1850 to break SAMA's monopoly. It is named after Redruth in Cornwall and its streets are named after Cornish mining towns. The township was the site of all original government buildings (courthouse, gaol and police station). The courthouse was erected in 1857, and Redruth Gaol, built in 1856, was the first country gaol in South Australia. From 1897 to 1922, the gaol was used as a girls' reformatory. SAMA delayed building in Redruth when they bought 77 of the 120 lots on offer at the initial land auction, paying almost 20 times the overall reserve price.

Kooringa

Kooringa was the first company township in Australia and, until the closure of the mine, was maintained as a strictly company-run town. The township's name is derived from the Aboriginal word kuri-ngga meaning either in the circle or locality of the sheoak. During the life of the Burra Burra Mine, the township was widely reported as shabby, rundown and poorly maintained with the inhabitants having little incentive to maintain their rented properties. Kooringa is still the main section of the town and is known as Burra South.

Llwchwr

Llwchwr, sometimes spelled Llychwr, was built by the Patent Copper Company (later the English and Australian Copper Company) to avoid the need to ship all of the ore to Wales. The streets are named after those in Llwchwr, Wales and other nearby villages. In May 1848, the company had imported from Swansea the entire smelting works comprising men, materials, tools, staff and families. Smelting was reported to be in operation by May 1849.

Aberdeen and New Aberdeen

In 1846 a group of speculators from Scotland formed the Bon Accord Mining Company, purchasing a section of land on the northern boundary of the special survey, hoping that the ore body extended under the boundary. Due to the lack of success in mining company, land near the mine was subdivided in 1849 forming Aberdeen (named after the east coastal city of Aberdeen in Scotland), with the company seeking to recoup some of their investment. Streets were named to honour directors of the Bon Accord Mining Company and the retention of mineral rights by the company prevented SAMA from acquiring the land, as they had in Redruth. New Aberdeen was subdivided after 1872 arrival of the railway line from Kapunda, and most of the early buildings in the two townships were constructed in the three years following.

Railway 

The broadgauge railway eventually went through Burra to reach a break of gauge station further north at Terowie.

It was erected in 1883, replacing the original building. Regular passenger services ended at the end of 1986, with the last passenger train being an ARHS steam train on 19 September 1992. After falling into disrepair, the station building has been renovated for use as a visitor centre and B&B.

Other townships

The townships of Copperhouse, Hampton and Nelson were not included in the 1940 proclamation forming the town of Burra, as they had become ghost towns. Other townships that either never succeeded or had been abandoned by 1940 were Princesstown, Lostwithiel, Westbury, Roachtown, Yarwood, Millertown, Warrapoota and Clonmel.

Burra today

Burra today is an important regional centre for surrounding farming communities and a historic tourist destination. From its 1994 declaration as a State Heritage Town, tourism has grown to an estimate of 41,000 visitors in 2000. While many visitors are day-trippers and are from Adelaide, over 40% of the visitors come from outside South Australia and over 50% stay overnight.

The town and mine are both well preserved with many original buildings, the water filled open cut mine, well-preserved mining buildings and a pump engine house which today houses a museum. Several chimneys from the mining industry have survived and a tourist trail showcases the old Redruth Gaol, miners' dugout cottages in the creek bank, a row of miners' cottages built in 1850, the cellars of the demolished Unicorn Brewery and other historic places. Burra is listed on the Register of the National Estate and many buildings are on the List of State Heritage Items. The town is publicly claimed to be the "Merino capital of the world".

Timeline

See also 
 List of reduplicated Australian place names

Notes

References

External links

 South Australian History – Burra
 Burra Visitor & Information Centre Retrieved 15 August 2011

 
Cornish-Australian culture
Mid North (South Australia)
Copper mines in South Australia
Mining towns in South Australia